Diogo Carvalho Pereira Leite (born 29 April 1989) is a Portuguese former professional footballer who played as a central defender. He studied sports management.

References

External links
 

1989 births
Living people
Portuguese footballers
Association football central defenders
Boavista F.C. players